This is the List of castles in Latvia, which includes fortified residences of Western European conquerors built in the area of present-day Latvia before the 17th century. There are about 140 medieval castles in the area, therefore this list is not complete. After the name of the castle comes the year of construction and a short description of its present-day condition.

Table of contents

Courland

Zemgale

Vidzeme

Latgale

See also
List of castles
List of castles in Estonia
List of palaces and manor houses in Estonia
List of palaces and manor houses in Latvia
List of hillforts in Latvia
List of castles in Lithuania

Additional information

References

Sources

External links
 Ambermarks - Medieval castles of Latvia - list

Latvia
Cas
Lists of castles by country
Castles